Jinnah of Pakistan is a biography of Muhammad Ali Jinnah by Stanley Wolpert. Wolpert described his subject as:

References

Further reading
 

Pakistani books
Books about Muhammad Ali Jinnah
Censored books
Oxford University Press Pakistan books